Lloyd George's Beer Song is a World War I era song written and composed by R. P. Weston and Bert Lee. The song is a response, or rather a good-natured complaint, against then Prime Minister David Lloyd George's actions to reduce alcohol consumption during wartime.

Lyrics

References

1915 songs
Songs of World War I
Songs written by Bert Lee
Songs written by R. P. Weston
Cultural depictions of David Lloyd George
Songs about Wilhelm II
Songs about prime ministers of the United Kingdom
Drinking songs